Aleksei Yevgenyevich Kravchenko (born 10 October 1969) is a Russian actor known for his role in the 1985 film Come and See as a young boy in the resistance army.

Biography 
Kravchenko was born in Moscow, Russian SFSR, Soviet Union. In 1985, aged 15, he made his debut in the film Come and See directed by Elem Klimov. He was 14 when filming started. After graduating from vocational school, he served in the Navy.

He attended the Boris Shchukin Theatre Institute, starting in 1991 and graduating in 1995 (he was taught by renowned actress Alla Kazanskaya).

He did not act in anything for more than a decade, but since 1998, he has appeared in at least one film or TV show almost every year. He was awarded the Merited Artist of the Russian Federation in 2007.

In 2020, he was awarded the People's Artist of Russia.

Filmography

Awards

2003 – State Prize of the Russian Federation in the area of literature and art - for his role in the film The Star.
20 August 2007 – Merited Artist of the Russian Federation - for merit in the arts
30 March 2020 – People's Artist of Russia - for great merit in the arts
18 May 2022 – Medal of the Order "For Merit to the Fatherland", 2nd class - for great contribution to the development of national culture and active civil position

References

External links
 
  Peoples.ru Biography (and interviews)

1969 births
20th-century Russian male actors
21st-century Russian male actors
Living people
Male actors from Moscow
Academicians of the Russian Academy of Cinema Arts and Sciences "Nika"
Honored Artists of the Russian Federation
People's Artists of Russia
Recipients of the Medal of the Order "For Merit to the Fatherland" II class
State Prize of the Russian Federation laureates
Russian male child actors
Russian male film actors
Russian male stage actors
Russian male television actors
Soviet male child actors
Soviet male film actors